Sheffield Area Middle/High School  is a public middle and high school located in the middle of Pennsylvania's Allegheny National Forest. The Sheffield campus is located along US Route 6 between Clarendon and Sheffield in eastern Warren County and is located on a 43-acre site. Sheffield Area Middle school/High School is one of four high schools operated by the Warren County School District.

Extracurriculars
The district offers a variety of clubs, activities and sports.

Athletics
The following athletic sports are held at Sheffield Area, which participates in PIAA District IX.

Cooperative Sports
There is also an opportunity for students to participate in the following cooperative sports at Warren Area High School:
Baseball
Cross Country
Golf
Swimming

Clubs
The following clubs are offered at Sheffield Area:
 Academic Bowl
 Art
 Home Economics
 JETS
 National Honor Society
 SADD
 Steel Drum
 Student Council
 Varsity Club
 Yearbook

Vocational Education Opportunities
Sophomores, Juniors and Seniors at Sheffield Area have the opportunity to spend one-half of each school day at the Warren County Career Center in Warren where they can learn from one of fourteen career programs, as well as the possibility of earning advanced placement credits for post-secondary education.

References

Schools in Warren County, Pennsylvania
Educational institutions established in 1979
Public high schools in Pennsylvania
Public middle schools in Pennsylvania
1979 establishments in Pennsylvania